Rudik-e Karim Bakhsh (also Romanized as Rūdīk-e Karīm Bakhsh and Rūdīk Karīm Bakhsh; also known as Rūdīg, Rūdīg-e Karīm Bakhsh, Rūdīk-e Bālā, Rūdī-ye Bālā, and Rūdi-ye Şaḩebdār) is a village in Negur Rural District, Dashtiari District, Chabahar County, Sistan and Baluchestan Province, Iran. At the 2006 census, its population was 452, in 76 families.

References 

Populated places in Chabahar County